Risky Woods is a fantasy-themed, side-scrolling platform game developed by Dinamic Software and Zeus Software and published by Electronic Arts in 1992.

Plot
The ancient monks who preserve the wisdom of the Lost Lands have been frozen in stone by antagonist Draxos and his minions. Young protagonist Rohan must plunge into the Risky Woods to release them. Only then can wisdom triumph once again.

Gameplay
Most of Risky Woods involves Rohan running, jumping between ledges and fighting monsters while freeing the monks from stone. There are four worlds, each with two levels, at the end of each world the player must face a guardian/boss. The worlds are Mountain Pass, Hanging Gardens, Catacombs and Hidden World. Rohan is initially armed with an infinite amount of throwing knives. Both the standard monsters such as skeletons and flying demons drop coins once defeated.

At the end of each level, coins can be spent at "Ye Olde Shoppe." Rohan can trade in his knives for fire, an axe, a chain, or a boomerang. The same weapon can be bought up to three times, increasing its power with each purchase. The player can also pay to top off their energy.

In order to complete a level, all good monks must be freed from stone. Bad monks are also trapped in stone and are indistinguishable from the good ones. Once freed, the bad monks will attack Rohan. The only way to avoid the bad monks is to remember their locations for the next playthrough.

The secondary objective of each level is to pass through "Eye toll gates." The player has to find two halves of an Eye-Key and then use the completed Eye-Key to pass through the door.

Chests drop from the sky randomly during gameplay and contain items that can either help or hinder. Bombs, shields, extra time, and lives make up the good offerings, while the bad offerings can send you back a few screens, send you to sleep and waste your time, or can flip the screen upside down.

Continues may be found during the game, but only two are given in the entirety of the game. Once those continues are used up, the game ends and the player has to restart the game. The final level leads to a castle in which Draxos must be defeated, afterward a short animation plays followed by the game over sequence.

The Sega Genesis/Mega Drive version has some differences from the other versions. The player is able to collect armor links which can be used to improve armor. The "Eye toll gates" require the player to repeat the melodies that the gatekeepers play using their control pad. Rohan holds a staff and wears a tunic or toga rather than the tank top and pants that he wears in the other version. The "Eye-Key" and coins are also visually different.

Reception
In 2017, HobbyConsolas named Risky Woods one of the greatest Spanish games ever released.

References

External links
Amiga Review on Risky Woods
GameSpy listing of Risky Woods

1992 video games
Amiga games
Atari ST games
Dinamic Software games
DOS games
Fantasy video games
Side-scrolling platform games
Sega Genesis games
Video games developed in Spain
Video games set in forests